Ruth Mary Mickey (born 1954) is a retired American statistician known for her research on feature selection to control the effects of confounding on statistical inference, and on the applications of statistics to issues of public health and natural resources. She is a professor emerita in the University of Vermont Department of Mathematics & Statistics.

Education
Mickey earned a master's degree in public health at the University of California, Los Angeles (UCLA) in 1978, and completed a Ph.D. in biostatistics at UCLA in 1983.

Books
Mickey is the coauthor of textbooks in statistics including:
Applied Statistics: Analysis of Variance and Regression (with Olive Jean Dunn and Virginia A. Clark, Wiley, 3rd ed., 2004)
Bayesian Statistics for Beginners: A Step-by-Step Approach (with Therese M. Donovan, Oxford University Press, 2019)

References

1954 births
Living people
American statisticians
American women statisticians
University of California, Los Angeles alumni
University of Vermont faculty